Tidjelabine is a town and commune in Boumerdès Province, Algeria. According to the 1998 census it has a population of 13,888.

Villages
The villages of the commune of Tidjelabine are:

Religion

Zawiyet Sidi Boumerdassi

History

French conquest

 Expedition of the Col des Beni Aïcha (1837)
 First Battle of the Issers (1837)

Algerian Revolution

Salafist terrorism

 2005 Tidjelabine bombing (29 July 2005)
 2006 Tidjelabine bombing (19 June 2006)
 2010 Tidjelabine bombing (7 April 2010)

Sport

Notable people

 Cheikh Boumerdassi (1818-1874)
 Mohamed Boumerdassi (1936-2010)
 Ali Bouyahiaoui (1928-1956)
 Mohamed Bouyahiaoui (1932-1958)
 Ahmed Mahsas (1923-2013)

References

Communes of Boumerdès Province